Scaevola tenuifolia is a species of flowering plant in the family Goodeniaceae. It is a prostrate herb with white to blue flowers and endemic to Western Australia.

Description

Taxonomy and naming
Scaevola tenuifolia was first formally described in 1990 Roger Charles Carolin and the description was published in Telopea.The specific epithet (tenuifolia) means "narrow flowered".

Distribution and habitat
This scaevola grows in quartzite soils on East Mount Barren and Thumb Peak range.

References

 
tenuifolia
Flora of Western Australia